Black Diamond is a term used pejoratively in South Africa to refer to a member of the new black middle class. The term was not originally derogatory. It was coined by TNS Research Surveys (Pty) Ltd and the UCT Unilever Institute to refer to members of South Africa's fast-growing, affluent and influential black community. However, the term evolved negative connotations and is now used almost exclusively as a pejorative term.

Black Diamond is similar to the concept of the WaBenzi.

References 

Class-related slurs
Colloquial terms
Middle class
Stereotypes of black people
Stereotypes of the middle class
Society of South Africa